The Gambit is a recording Finnish musician, producer and composer. The Gambit debuted in Finland in 2005 with his single Move Gambit/Cos My Clique Is, which charted in the top 10 of the Finnish Singles Chart. As an artist composing, writing and producing his own music, The Gambit became internationally known after releasing his debut English album in 2007 and collaborating with international artists such as Deams, De La Soul, Ice-T and Psycho Les of The Beatnuts. During the years 2012-2014 The Gambit has released three Finnish solo albums  and a collaboration album with Juno  catching attention with his singles  in the social media as well as on YouTube.

Composing 

The Gambit’s compositions have featured artists such as Ice-T, De La Soul, Psycho Les (The Beatnuts), Deams, Marika Krook, Juno, Kevin Tandu and Chebaleba.

Directing and producing 

He works as a director, producer and composer producing films and music for several companies. He has also directed music videos for other well-known Finnish artists.

The Gambit is currently working on an English urban soul solo album.

Discography

Albums
 Rosary (2007)
 Kaupunkishamaani (2012)
 Tervetuloa Suomen Floridaan! (2013)
 Trapetsitaiteiluu (with Juno, 2014)
 Parhaat (2014)

Singles
 Move Gambit / Cos My Clique Is (Feat. Samuel) (2005)
 Snake Styles (2008)
 G.A.M.B.I.T. (2008)
 5–0 (Don't Stop) (2008)
 Trailblazer (Feat. Kayla G) (2010)
 Mitä Kurko (Feat. Samuel) (2011)
 Esirippu (Feat. Juno) (2012)
 Jos Sä Haluut Olla Mun Kaa (Feat. Justin Cameo) (2012)
 Señorita (2013)
 Diggaan (With Juno, 2014)
 Unelmat (With Juno, Feat. Johanna Försti, 2014)
 Love Thang (2015)
 Dream Team (2015)

References

External links 
 Official website
 The Gambit YouTube
 The Gambit Spotify
 The Gambit Facebook
 The Gambit Instagram
 The Gambit Twitter
 The Gambit on the official Charts of Finland

1982 births
Living people
Finnish producers
Finnish rappers